Ardoch can refer to:

 Ardoch, Perth and Kinross, Scotland
 Ardoch, North Dakota, USA
 Ardoch, a community within North Frontenac, Ontario, Canada
 Ardoch Algonquin First Nation, Ontario, Canada
 Ardoch Burn, stream in Scotland
 Ardoch National Wildlife Refuge, North Dakota, USA
 Ardoch Roman Fort, Scotland